Anthony Brady may refer to:

 Anton Brady (born 1994), Scottish footballer 
 Anthony N. Brady (1841–1913), American businessman